Gary Thomas Hibbs (born 26 January 1957) is an English former professional footballer who played in the Football League as a midfielder.

References

1957 births
Living people
Footballers from Hammersmith
English footballers
Association football midfielders
Leyton Orient F.C. players
Aldershot F.C. players
Salisbury City F.C. players
English Football League players